Georges Yhambot (born 22 February 1922) was a Congolese planter and politician. He was elected to the Congolese Territorial Assembly in 1957, as a candidate of the African Socialist Movement (MSA). Soon after the election he and several of his followers left the MSA to join UDDIA.

References

1922 births
Republic of the Congo politicians
Republic of the Congo socialists
Possibly living people